Claude Henry Rigby (9 January 1878 – 7 December 1924) was a pharmacist, and a former Australian rules footballer who played with Carlton and Melbourne in the Victorian Football League (VFL), and with Richmond Football Club in the VFA.

Family
The son of Dr. George Owen Rigby (1916), and Frances Maria Rigby (1841-1926), née English, Claude Henry Rigby was born at Kyneton, Victoria on 9 January 1878. He married Isabella Ellen Megson (1881-1952) in 1908.

Football
He was a "fleet-footed, lightly framed wingman".

Carlton (VFL) 
Recruited from Kyneton, he played 29 games for Carlton Football Club over the three seasons, 1900 to 1902.

In 1900 he played for a VFL intra-state team, against a combined Ballarat  Association team.

He played his last game for Carlton against Fitzroy on 7 June 1902 (round 6); and, a week later, he turned out for Kyneton Collegians in the Kyneton District Football Association.

Collingwood Juniors Football Club (VJFA)
In 1904 he was granted a clearance from both  the Kyneton Football Club and Carlton to Collingwood Juniors Football Club in the Victorian Junior Football Association.

Richmond (VFA)
Granted a clearance from Carlton in 1905, he played for the Richmond Football Club in 1905 and 1906; and, playing on the wing, was a member of the 1905 Richmond (VFA) premiership team.

Melbourne (VFL)
He played 27 games for the Melbourne Football Club in two seasons, 1907 and 1908.

Death
A qualified pharmacist, and although in poor health, Rigby died unexpectedly — "[as] the result of a severe attack of ptomaine poisoning" — at his U.F.S. dispensary in Queens Parade, Clifton Hill, Victoria, on 7 December 1924.

Notes

References
 Hogan P: The Tigers Of Old, Richmond FC, (Melbourne), 1996.

External links 

 		
 Harry Rigby's profile at Blueseum
 Harry Rigby: Demonwiki.
 Harry Rigby: The VFA Project.
 Harry Rigby: australianfootball.com.

1878 births
1924 deaths
Deaths from food poisoning
Australian rules footballers from Victoria (Australia)
Carlton Football Club players
Richmond Football Club (VFA) players
Melbourne Football Club players
Australian pharmacists